O Meu Pé de Laranja Lima is a 1970 Brazilian telenovela, based on the book of the same name.

Cast and characters
Eva Wilma .... Jandira
Cláudio Corrêa e Castro .... Manuel Valadares (Portuga)
Sílvio Rocha .... Paulo
Lélia Abramo .... Estefânia
Haroldo Botta .... Zezé
Bete Mendes .... Glória (Godóia)
Analu Graci .... Lili
Carlos Zara .... Raul
Dênis Carvalho .... Henrique
Fausto Rocha .... Diogo
Ivan Mesquita .... Caetano
Nicette Bruno .... Cecília
Gianfrancesco Guarnieri .... Ariovaldo
Jacyra Sampaio .... Eugênia
Edgard Franco .... Ricardo
Abrahão Farc .... Padre Rosendo
Dênis Carvalho .... Henrique Muniz
Henrique Martins .... Comendador Vicente Del Nero
Luís Carlos de Moraes .... Túlio
Ana Maria Dias .... Helena Del Nero
Cosme dos Santos.... Narciso
Dirce Militello .... Santinha
João José Pompeo .... Gabriel
Terezinha Cubano .... Gilda
Douglas Mazzolla .... Luisinho
Gessy Fonseca .... Leonor
Régis Monteiro .... Sabugo
Genésio Almeida Júnior .... Vavá
Alexandre Araujo .... Totoca
Geny Prado .... Nhá Vina
Vera Nunes .... Diana
Silvia Lebron .... Irmã Tereza
Ruthinéia de Moraes .... Madre Celeste
Renato Consorte .... Padre Juca

References

External links 
 

1970 telenovelas
Brazilian telenovelas
1970 Brazilian television series debuts
1971 Brazilian television series endings
Children's telenovelas